Virgile Rossel (19 March 1858 – 29 May 1933) was a Swiss jurist, politician and writer. He was President of the Swiss National Council in 1909/1910 and President of the Federal Supreme Court 1929–1930.

Rossel was born in Tramelan. He graduated in legal and literary studies at the Universities of Leipzig, Berne, Strasbourg and Paris. He received a doctorate in law from the University of Berne in 1879. He also had an honorary doctorate from the University of Geneva in 1909. He began teaching from 1883, when he was appointed a professor of civil law at the University of Berne. He taught until 1912. He was also rector of the university in 1894 and 1907. From 1912 to 1932, Rossel was a judge of the Federal Supreme Court. He was succeeded by his son Jean Rossel.

Avenue Virgile-Rossel in Lausanne and rue Virgile Rossel in Tramelan are named after him. A monument with his portrait in relief by Joseph Constantin Kaiser and Joseph Robert Kaiser was erected in Tramelan.

Works 
 Histoire littéraire de la Suisse romande des origines à nos jours, Genève 1889–1891, 2 vol. (rééd. Neuchâtel 1903; Lausanne 1990)
 Histoire du Jura bernois, Genève 1914
 Le Roi des paysans, Lausanne, 1915
 Sorbeval, roman jurassien, Lausanne 1925
 Ce que femme veut..., roman féministe, Neuchâtel, 1931.
 Anne Sentéri : Roman. Mœurs romanches, 1908
 Au cœur de la vie : Vers - Sonnets et poèmes - Petite et grande patrie, Lausanne, 1935
 Blanche Leu et autres nouvelles bernoises, Lausanne, 1913
 Le chemin qui monte : Pièce morale en deux actes, La Neuveville, 1895
 Clément Rochard : Roman de mœurs politiques suisses. La Chaux-de-Fonds, 1903
 Cœurs simples : Roman de mœurs suisses. Genève, 1894
 La course au Bonheur : Roman, Lausanne, 1923
 Davel : Poème dramatique en cinq actes, Lausanne, 1898
 Démétrius : Drame en vers: un prologue, quatre actes, six tableaux, Zurich, 1912
 La démocratie et son évolution. Berne, 1905
 Les deux Forces : Roman, Lausanne 1905
 Eugène Rambert : Sa vie, son temps et son œuvre. Lausanne, 1917
 Le flambeau : Roman, Lausanne, 1920
 Le grand jour : Roman. Lausanne, 1929
 Histoire de la littérature française hors de France, Lausanne, 1895
 Histoire des relations littéraires entre la France et l'Allemagne, Genève, 1970, réédition
 Histoire littéraire de la Suisse romande des origines à nos jours, Neuchâtel, 1903
 Jours difficiles : Roman de mœurs suisses, Genève, 1896
 Là-haut sur la Montagne ... : Poèmes alpestres, Lausanne, 1921
 Le Maître : Roman, Lausanne, 1906
 Une mère : Épisode de la guerre Anglo-transvaalienne. Drame en un acte en vers. Lausanne, 1901
 Morgarten : Drame en quatre actes en vers, Lausanne, 1905
 Le peuple Roi ou Grandeur et misères de la démocratie, Lausanne, 1933
 Robert Caze : notes et souvenirs, Porrentruy, 1983, réédition
 Le roman d'un Neutre, Lausanne, 1918
 La seconde Jeunesse : Journal d'un Poète. Lausanne, 1888
 La vaudoise : Pièce en trois actes. Lausanne, 1907
 Poèmes suisses, Lausanne, 1893

References

External links 

 
 

Members of the National Council (Switzerland)
Presidents of the National Council (Switzerland)
Federal Supreme Court of Switzerland judges
1858 births
1933 deaths
Swiss male writers
19th-century Swiss writers
20th-century Swiss writers
University of Bern alumni
People from the canton of Bern
Academic staff of the University of Bern
19th-century male writers
20th-century male writers
20th-century Swiss judges